The 2018 Havering London Borough Council election was held on 3 May 2018 to elect members of Havering London Borough Council in Greater London. Elections were held for all 54 seats on the council. This was on the same day as other local elections.

Summary of results
The Conservative Party gained three seats, increasing its number of councillors to 25. It consolidated its position as the largest group on the council, but did not gain overall control.

Havering Residents Association lost two seats, reducing its number of councillors to 17. However, it remained the second largest party on the council. Of its 17 councillors, eight represent Hornchurch Residents' Association, six Upminster and Cranham Residents' Association and three Harold Wood Hill Park Residents Association.

The Labour Party gained four seats, increasing its number of councillors to five. It is now the third largest party on the council.

Rainham and Wennington Independent Residents Group held three seats and South Hornchurch Independent Residents Group held two. Together, they form the Independent Residents' Group. The Harold Hill Independent Party won one seat.

One independent candidate, Michael Deon-Burton, won a seat in South Hornchurch ward. However, shortly after being elected he joined the Conservative Party and was elected Deputy Mayor. Voters, councillors and defeated candidates protested the decision, and alleged that some other councillors who had been elected as Residents' Association candidates were now supporting the Conservative group.

The UK Independence Party lost all seven of its seats on the council.

|}

Results by ward

Brooklands

Cranham

Elm Park

Emerson Park

Gooshays

Hacton

Harold Wood

Havering Park

Heaton

Hylands

Mawneys

Pettits

Rainham and Wennington

Romford Town

Saint Andrews

South Hornchurch

Squirrels Heath

Upminster

References

2018
2018 London Borough council elections